Harvey Nicklos Miguel Carey (born March 18, 1979) is a Filipino-American former professional basketball player. He spent his entire career with the TNT Tropang Giga in the Philippine Basketball Association (PBA).

On February 1, 2021, Carey announced his retirement from professional basketball.

PBA career statistics

Season-by-season averages
 
|-
| align=left | 
| align=left | Talk 'N Text
| 56 || 29.6 || .487 || .083 || .507 || 8.5 || 1.3 || .7 || .3 || 10.7
|-
| align=left | 
| align=left | Talk 'N Text
| 27 || 19.4 || .513 || .000 || .500 || 4.7 || 1.0 || .3 || .0 || 6.7
|-
| align=left | 
| align=left | Talk 'N Text
| 41 || 23.6 || .514 || .000 || .505 || 7.2 || .7 || .5 || .6 || 7.7
|-
| align=left | 
| align=left | Talk 'N Text
| 62 || 30.8 || .580 || .000 || .523 || 7.6 || 1.5 || .4 || .2 || 11.4
|-
| align=left | 
| align=left | Talk 'N Text
| 34 || 24.1 || .401 || .000 || .587 || 4.7 || 1.7 || .5 || .4 || 5.6
|-
| align=left | 
| align=left | Talk 'N Text
| 46 || 30.2 || .545 || .000 || .604 || 9.7 || 1.7 || .3 || .8 || 8.6
|-
| align=left | 
| align=left | Talk 'N Text
| 46 || 26.9 || .562 || .000 || .579 || 8.2 || 1.6 || .5 || .4 || 10.8
|-
| align=left | 
| align=left | Talk 'N Text
| 65 || 21.8 || .476 || .000 || .639 || 8.0 || 1.4 || .3 || .3 || 8.5
|-
| align=left | 
| align=left | Talk 'N Text
| 45 || 18.3 || .445 || .200 || .648 || 6.3 || 1.0 || .2 || .2 || 6.4
|-
| align=left | 
| align=left | Talk 'N Text
| 55 || 13.8 || .419 || .000 || .804 || 4.6 || .6 || .3 || .1 || 3.8
|-
| align=left | 
| align=left | Talk 'N Text
| 47 || 15.7 || .406 || .000 || .542 || 4.8 || .5 || .2 || .3 || 3.7
|-
| align=left | 
| align=left | Talk 'N Text
| 46 || 16.0 || .446 || .000 || .608 || 5.4 || .5 || .3 || .4 || 4.2
|-
| align=left | 
| align=left | TNT
| 39 || 13.7 || .450 || .000 || .569 || 5.3 || .7 || .2 || .4 || 3.9
|-
| align=left | 
| align=left | TNT
| 47 || 9.7 || .478 || .000 || .674 || 3.3 || .5 || .2 || .2 || 2.5
|-
| align=left | 
| align=left | TNT
| 36 || 8.9 || .347 || .333 || .618 || 2.6 || .4 || .2 || .3 || 2.1
|-
| align=left | 
| align=left | TNT
| 25 || 6.2 || .345 || .000 || 1.000 || 1.9 || .3 || .1 || .2 || .9
|-
| align=left | 
| align=left | TNT
| 11 || 6.9 || .400 || .000 || .500 || 1.8 || .8 || .0 || .0 || .8
|-class=sortbottom
| align=center colspan=2 | Career
| 728 || 19.9 || .492 || .074 || .579 || 6.1 || 1.0 || .3 || .3 || 6.4

References 

1979 births
Living people
American men's basketball players
Basketball players from San Francisco
Filipino men's basketball players
Philippine Basketball Association All-Stars
Power forwards (basketball)
Small forwards
Sonoma State Seawolves men's basketball players
TNT Tropang Giga players
TNT Tropang Giga draft picks
American sportspeople of Filipino descent
Citizens of the Philippines through descent